Jellystone! is an American animated comedy series based on the characters of Hanna-Barbera. Below is a list of characters that appear in the show.

Jellystone Hospital
 Yogi Bear (voiced by Jeff Bergman) - A brown bear who is a doctor at Jellystone Hospital. Yogi is self-assured, though a goofball. His first love is food, and crazy schemes will sometimes come into play in order to get his paws on some goodies. Originally from The Huckleberry Hound Show and The Yogi Bear Show.
 Boo Boo (voiced by C.H. Greenblatt) - A brown bear who is a nurse at Jellystone Hospital. Boo Boo is Yogi’s mild-mannered sidekick, housemate, and best buddy. Though somewhat meek and less prone to wackiness, he is loyal to his more off-the-wall friends. Originally from The Huckleberry Hound Show and The Yogi Bear Show.
 Cindy Bear (voiced by Grace Helbig) - A brown bear who is a doctor at Jellystone Hospital. Cindy completes the trio of hospital bears, at times acting as the team’s take-charge leader. Her obsession with dangerous inventions and unauthorized medical procedures typically leads to chaos. However, when her ideas backfire, she will often feign ignorance. Originally from The Yogi Bear Show.
 Ranger Smith (voiced by Jeff Bergman) - The hospital administrator. Originally from The Yogi Bear Show.
 Winsome Witch (voiced by Lesley Nicol) - A witch who runs the hospital cafeteria. Originally from The Secret Squirrel Show. Unlike her original counterpart, Winnie speaks with a British accent.

Jellystone City Hall
 Huckleberry Hound (voiced by Jim Conroy) - A Bluetick Coonhound who is the Mayor of Jellystone. Huck is laidback and simplistic - and simple-minded - in his approach to running Jellystone. The town's weekly chaos typically gets a calm reaction from Huckleberry. Originally from The Huckleberry Hound Show.
 Mr. Jinks (voiced by Jeff Bergman) - A cat who is Mayor Huckleberry Hound's personal assistant. Originally from The Huckleberry Hound Show.
 Snagglepuss (voiced by Dana Snyder) - A  mountain lion  and Mayor Huckleberry Hound’s go-to for public relations. He also hosts different talk shows in Jellystone and also works as the local newsman at the Jellystone News Studio. Originally from The Quick Draw McGraw Show and The Yogi Bear Show.

Jellystone Elementary School
 El Kabong (voiced by Bernardo de Paula) - A horse and teacher at the school who doubles as the town’s own guitar-wielding superhero. Originally from The Quick Draw McGraw Show. Unlike his original counterpart, El Kabong is Hispanic and remains in his superhero persona with no hint of an alter ego ever being revealed.
 Augie Doggie (voiced by Georgie Kidder) - An eager young pup who has a close relationship with her father, Doggie Daddy. Unlike her original counterpart, Augie is depicted as a girl in this show. Canonically 11 years old, or 132 months old, in the episode "My Doggie Dave".  One of Augie's favorite father-daughter activities is exchanging fifty kisses. Her two best friends are Shag Rugg and Yakky Doodle. Originally from The Quick Draw McGraw Show.
 Yakky Doodle (voiced by Katie Grober) - Originally from The Yogi Bear Show. Yakky is depicted as a little girl duck and no longer speaks in buccal speech. She is an overly cautious worrywart and is best friends with Augie Doggie and Shag Rugg. 
 Shag Rugg (voiced by Ron Funches) - One of The Hillbilly Bears, Shag is a cool bear cub with a penchant for hip lingo and fun, stylish life. Originally from The Atom Ant Show.
 Ruff and Reddy (voiced by Oscar Reyez & Jakari Fraser) Originally from The Ruff and Reddy Show. Ruff and Reddy are depicted as a pair of robot kids who are a cat and a dog with a bit of a friendly rivalry.
 Lambsy Divey (voiced by Dana Snyder) - A young skateboarder lamb. Originally from Cattanooga Cats.
 Ding-a-Ling Wolf - A small wolf. Originally from The Huckleberry Hound Show.
 Caveman "Cavey" Jr. (voiced by Dana Snyder) - Captain Caveman's equally rambunctious son whom he discovers frozen in one of Jellystone's icecaps. Originally from The Flintstone Kids.

The Alley
 Top Cat (voiced by Thomas Lennon) - A cat who is the slick and conniving leader of the alley cats. T.C. is often seen cooking up schemes to sucker the residents of Jellystone and pocket some quick cash with some of them going awry.
 Benny the Ball (voiced by C.H. Greenblatt) - A member of Top Cat's gang.
 Choo-Choo (voiced by Jenny Lorenzo) - A member of Top Cat's gang who is depicted as girl in this show.
 Brain (voiced by Georgie Kidder) - Brain is a member of Top Cat's gang who retains more of a sarcastic tone and habit of using the word “like” in the middle of sentences (a trait previously attributed to Spook). Like Choo-Choo, she is also depicted as a girl in this show.
 Fancy Fancy (voiced by Andrew Frankel) - A member of Top Cat's gang.
 Spooky (voiced by Jenny Lorenzo) - A genderbent version of Spook who is now depicted as the gang's brainless and silent cook.
 The King (voiced by Bernardo de Paula) - A cool, Fonzie-like lion who rivals Top Cat in the episode "Cats Do Dance". King and his friends are talented dancers. The King has also been shown to indulge in some petty criminal activities. In "Jailcation", The King was seen as an inmate of Santo Relaxo. Originally from CB Bears.
 Big H - A hippopotamus and member of King's group who is depicted as a girl in this show.
 Clyde - A light-brown gorilla and member of King's group.
 Skids - A bucket-wearing alligator and member of King's group who is depicted as a girl in this show.
 Yuka Yuka - A hyena and member of King's group. In "Santo Relaxo", Yuka Yuka was seen as an inmate at Santo Relaxo.

Jellystone Police Department
 Touché Turtle (voiced by Dana Snyder) - Jellystone’s chief of police and a less intelligent Musketeer-like swords-turtle. Originally from The Hanna-Barbera New Cartoon Series.
 Yippee, Yappee and Yahooey (voiced by C.H. Greenblatt, Grace Helbig, and Jim Conroy) - Three silly dog police officers who, like Touche, dress in Musketeer-style clothing and carry around swords. Yappee is depicted as a girl in this show. Originally from The Peter Potamus Show.

Town proprietors
 Magilla Gorilla (voiced by Paul F. Tompkins) - A gorilla who is the owner of a haberdashery called "Magilla's", which specializes in bow ties and hats. Originally from The Magilla Gorilla Show. Unlike his earlier counterpart, Magilla is a fashion freak, seeing his clothing style as art, and wears a pair of glasses.
 Jabberjaw (voiced by Niccole Thurman) - A cheerful shark who is Magilla's star employee. Unlike previous incarnations of the character, Jabberjaw is depicted as a girl. Jabberjaw is boy-crazy, with a readiness to please the male residents of Jellystone. She seems to be particularly fond of El Kabong.
 Loopy De Loop (voiced by Ulka Simone Mohanty) - A French-Canadian wolf who is Jabberjaw's coworker and friend. Like Jabberjaw, Loopy is depicted as a girl. While her original counterpart displayed friendliness and do-good spirit, Jellystone's Loopy is often deadpan and sarcastic, often making such suggestions as burning down the clothing store. 
 Doggie Daddy (voiced by C.H. Greenblatt) - Augie Doggie's father and an excitable helicopter canine parent who is the lighthouse keeper. Nothing makes Doggie Daddy happier than spending time with his daughter, whom he has a hard time leaving alone. Originally from The Quick Draw McGraw Show.
 Peter Potamus (voiced by C.H. Greenblatt) - A lonely Otaku and martial arts enthusiast hippopotamus who spends time with his action figures (in lieu of actual friends). Other times, he tries to hang out with the other citizens. In the second season, his occupation was revealed to be a mail carrier for Jellystone's postal service with his balloon as his mode of transportation. Originally from The Peter Potamus Show.
 So-So (voiced by George Takei) - A monkey who originated in The Peter Potamus Show. So-So is rarely seen in Jellystone, but does appear as Peter's fight trainer in the episode "Jelly Wrestle Rumble". In the second season, he continues to work with Peter Potamus through the town's postal service.
 Squiddly Diddly (voiced by Niccole Thurman) - An octopus who is the proprietor of the music store. Squiddly has been gender-switched and speaks with a valley girl accent. Originally from The Secret Squirrel Show.
 Shazzan (voiced by Fajer Al-Kaisi) - A jovial genie who is seen working a variety of vending jobs in Jellystone and also works a ticket seller at the Jellystone Theatre.
 Jonny Quest and Hadji (voiced by Andrew Frankel and Fajer Al-Kaisi) - The operators of Quest Bowl, the town’s bowling alley. Originally from the Jonny Quest franchise, the two are depicted as adults and a married couple in this show.
 Rugg Family - Shag Rugg’s hillbilly family who run the Mud Bug Cafe. Originally from The Atom Ant Show. 
 Paw Rugg (voiced by Jim Conroy) - Shag Rugg's father whose mumbling is understood by his family. His name is misspelled "Pa Rugg" in the credits.
 Maw Rugg (voiced by Angelique Perrin) -  Shag Rugg's mother.
 Floral Rugg (voiced by Georgie Kidder) - Shag Rugg's older sister.
 Chopper (voiced by Angelique Perrin) - Originally from The Yogi Bear Show. Chopper is depicted as a female and is Yakky Doodle's adoptive canine mother. She's tougher than her daughter and not afraid to be lovingly rough. Chopper is revealed to run the Cattanooga Pizza Explosion pizzeria.
 Morocco Mole (voiced by Dana Snyder) - A fez-wearing, bespectacled mole who runs "Saunas, Sweats & Sandwiches" in response to the fact that people can't eat sandwiches in a sauna. Originally from Secret Squirrel.

Other Jellystone townsfolk
 Captain Caveman (voiced by Jim Conroy) - A fun-loving caveman who often hangs out with the likes of Yogi Bear and Jabberjaw. Captain Caveman lives in a van where it's interior resembles a cave. Originally from Captain Caveman and the Teen Angels.
 Wally Gator (voiced by Jeff Bergman) - A cheerful dimwitted alligator. In "DNA, A-OK!", it’s implied that Wally lives in the sewers of Jellystone. However, this may not be true according to "The Box Thief" where he was living in a house, though he was seen in the sewers in the latter episode. Originally from The Hanna-Barbera New Cartoon Series.
 Bobbie Looey (voiced by Jenny Lorenzo) - Based on Baba Looey from The Quick Draw McGraw Show. Unlike Baba, Bobbie is a well-spoken business burrow and is a lady.
 The Banana Splits - Originating from The Banana Splits Adventure Hour, the Banana Splits are depicted as hardened yet cartoonish criminals that clash with El Kabong and make their hideout at the abandoned Oversized Cartoon Prop Warehouse. At one point, they recalled that they used to be cool. Their roles as antagonists are based upon their 2019 live-action horror film adaptation.
 Fleegle (voiced by Paul F. Tompkins) - The Banana Splits' leader. Unlike his live-action counterpart and his animated counterpart in The Banana Splits in Hocus Pocus Park, Fleegle's tongue doesn't hang out of his mouth while he speaks nor does he speak in a lisp.
 Bingo (voiced by Jim Conroy) - An orange ape and member of the Banana Splits. In this show, Bingo is shown to be the largest of the group.
 Drooper (voiced by C.H. Greenblatt) - A lion and member of the Banana Splits.
 Snorky - An elephant and member of the Banana Splits that mostly makes honking sounds.
 Grape Ape (voiced by C.H. Greenblatt) - A purple 40 ft. gorilla.
 Granny Sweet (voiced by Grace Helbig) - A kindly elderly woman who is the town's judge. Originally from The Atom Ant Show.
 Bristle Hound - A dog from Cattanooga Cats who is the court bailiff.
 Lippy the Lion and Hardy Har Har (voiced by Jeff Bergman and Jenny Lorenzo) - Unlike their original counterparts, Lippy and Hardy are depicted as an elderly Jewish couple with Hardy’s gender-switched.
 Mildew Wolf (voiced by Bernardo de Paula) - A flamboyant wolf. In the episode "Grocery Store", Mildew attempts to flirt with Shazzan, indicating that the character is portrayed as a gay person (possibly as a nod to Mildew's original voice actor Paul Lynde who often poked fun at his barely closeted homosexuality). Originally from Cattanooga Cats.
 Brenda Chance, Dee Dee Sykes, and Taffy Dare (voiced by Georgie Kidder, Niccole Thurman, and Grace Helbig) - Formerly Captain Caveman’s teammates in Captain Caveman and the Teen Angels, these three are seen working various jobs at Jellystone including receptionists at the Jellystone Hospital and newscasters. Dee Dee is also seen working at the Cattanooga Pizza Explosion.
 Pixie (voiced by Jenny Lorenzo) and Dixie - A pair of mice who are always seen together. Though they are rarely seen in Jellystone, Hardy Har Har confirms in "Baby Shenanigans" that they work at a candy store. Dixie is also gender-switched in this show. Originally from The Huckleberry Hound Show.
 Kwicky Koala (voiced by Paul F. Tompkins) - A koala. Some of his appearances has Kwicky wearing a flower near his ear. Originally from The Kwicky Koala Show.
 Speed Buggy - A dune buggy with working facial features.
 Tinker (voiced by Dana Snyder) - Speed Buggy's driver. 
 J. Whimple Dimple - An elderly resident of Jellystone who Top Cat was scamming. In "Jailcation", J. Whimple Dimple was seen on the tracks juggling a bunch of babies. Originally from The Magilla Gorilla Show episode "Big Game" where he was a hunter.
 Atom Ant - A tiny ant with incredible physical strength. Though he is rarely seen in the series, he was briefly seen helping out with the wrestling match in "Jelly Wrestle Rumble!" 
 Snooper and Blabber (voiced by Georgie Kidder and Bernardo de Paula) - A cat and mouse detective duo. Originally from The Quick Draw McGraw Show, Snooper here is depicted as female while Blabber retains being male with facial hair.
 Dirty Dawg (voiced by Jeff Bergman) - A vagrant Labrador Retriever who is a caricature artist and an old friend of Lippy and Hardy. Originally from The Kwicky Koala Show.

Background Jellystone townsfolk
These characters appear in town sporadically, but don't seem to have much of a function so far:

 Hokey Wolf - Originally from The Huckleberry Hound Show. Currently only involved whenever there's a big crowd, particularly in the second season. His relationship with Ding-a-Ling is also unclear at present. 
 The Hair Bear Bunch - Originally the stars of Help!... It’s the Hair Bear Bunch!
 Hair Bear - Leader of the Hair Bear Bunch.
 Square Bear - Member of the Hair Bear Bunch.
 Bubi Bear - Member of the Hair Bear Bunch.
 The CB Bears - Originally the stars of CB Bears
 Hustle - Leader of the C.B. Bears.
 Bump - Member of the C.B. Bears.
 Boogie - Member of the C.B. Bears.

Guest characters
 Axel - A skeleton who is attached to Winsome Witch's race car in the episode "Face of the Town". Originally from the "Fender Bender 500" segment of Wake, Rattle and Roll.
 Baby Puss - A saber-toothed tiger who battles Captain Caveman and Cavey, Jr. in the episode "Ice Ice Daddy". Originally from The Flintstones. Here, Baby Puss is depicted as more sinister.
 The Biskitts - The mascots for various food and drink products sold in Jellystone.
 Fred Flintstone (voiced by Jeff Bergman) - He was seen on the cover of a book that the book club read about in "Must Be Jelly" and can be heard during the film "Revenge of the Gruesomes" in "Uh Oh! It's a Burglar!" Originally from The Flintstones.
 The Clue Club - Featured in a cutaway in the episode "A Coconut to Remember". The members include Larry, Pepper, D.D., Dottie, Sheriff Bagley, and dogs Woofer (voiced by C.H. Greenblatt) and Wimper. Unlike their original counterparts, Larry, D.D., and Sheriff Bagley are depicted as dark-skinned people in this show.
 Mr. Peebles - From The Magilla Gorilla Show where he ran a pet shop that acted as Magilla’s home. Mr. Peebles is referenced in Jellystone through a few photographs from Magilla's past, but their relationship is not made clear. Mr. Peebles was seen in person in "The Brave Little Daddy" playing in the orchestra at the time when Doggie Daddy was attempting to discipline Grape Ape.
 Quack-Up (voiced by Fajer Al-Kaisi) - A goofy duck who tries to sell Augie Doggie insurance in the episode "Grocery Store". Originally from Yogi's Space Race and Galaxy Goof-Ups.
 The Neptunes - Consisting of Biff, Bubbles, Clamhead, and Shelly, they are Jabberjaw’s former band mates. Shelly is the most recurring one as she is often seen working as a cashier at Barbera's.
 Bleep (voiced by Jim Conroy) - An alien who pays visits in the episodes "Mr. Flabby Dabby Wabby Jabby" and "Bleep". In this show, Bleep can be vicious if given something with hot sauce. Originally from Josie and the Pussycats in Outer Space.
 Glump (voiced by Fajer Al-Kaisi) - A Stegosaurus who specifically refers to himself as "Glump, from the Valley of the Dinosaurs". He is seen as Top Cat's therapy patient in the episode 'Ice Ice Daddy" where he talks about getting over his fear of meteors before a fragment of rock strikes their session. Unlike his original self who was merely a pet animal, Glump is anthropomorphic and capable of speech in this show.
 The Cattanooga Cats - Consisting of Country (voiced by Scott Whyte), Kitty Jo (voiced by Georgie Kidder), Scoots, and Groove, the rock band is depicted as singing animatronics at the Cattanooga Pizza Explosion that are similar to The Rock-afire Explosion band and Munch's Make-Believe Band at Chuck E. Cheese. Their dog Teeny Tim is depicted as a robot waiter in the show. The horror theme is similar to Five Nights at Freddy's as a response to The Banana Splits Movie.
 The Funky Phantom (voiced by Paul F. Tompkins) - A ghost who was formerly a famous wrestler and Mayor Huckleberry Hound’s childhood hero. The Funky Phantom now works as an avocado salesman. In "Jailcation", the Funky Phantom appears as an inmate at Santo Relaxo.
 Mightor (voiced by Jim Conroy) - The Funky Phantom's wrestling opponent in the Phantom's infamous final match. Originally from Moby Dick and Mighty Mightor.
 Gravity Girl - A character from Birdman and the Galaxy Trio who is a wrestling referee.
 The Great Gazoo (voiced by Flula Borg) - A sociopathic green alien who hosts the virtual reality game "BuddyBlasters" in the episode "Gotta Kiss Them All". Originally from The Flintstones. He becomes a background character in season 2 as seen in "The Sea Monster of Jellystone Cove".
 Yankee Doodle Pigeon - A carrier pigeon who appears in Yogi Bear's movie in the episode "A Town Video: Welcome to Jellystone". Originally from Dastardly and Muttley in their Flying Machines.
 Klunk (voiced by Fajer Al-Kaisi) - A criminal that steals Jabberjaw's ice cream and is defeated by El Kabong. Originally from Dastardly and Muttley in their Flying Machines.
 Scrappy-Doo - He appears on a milk carton Cindy drinks. His cameo is a reference to his lack of appearances due to his reception.
 Zandor - He appears on a TV show that Cindy and Bleep watch. Originally from The Herculoids.
 Gloop - Gloop appears on a TV show that Cindy and Bleep watch getting hugged by Zandor. Gloop is depicted as a girl in this show. Originally from The Herculoids.
 Space Ghost (voiced by Paul F. Tompkins) - A ghost-themed galactic superhero whose Phantom Cruiser ends up in a collision with Bleep's ship. Originally from Space Ghost.
 Moby Dick - A white sperm whale that lives in the waters of Jellystone Cove. Originally from Moby Dick and Mighty Mightor.
 Barney Rubble (voiced by Paul F. Tompkins) - His voice can be heard during the movie "Revenge of the Gruesomes". Originally from The Flintstones.
 Weirdly Gruesome - He appeared in the movie "Revenge of the Gruesomes". Originally from The Flintstones.
 Dino - He appeared as a playground toy. Originally from The Flintstones.
 Orbity - He appeared as a playground toy. Originally from The Jetsons.
 Zorak - A Dokarian who was seen on the movie poster for "Brakbud Peak" (a Brokeback Mountain parody and a reference to the Zorak/Brak slash pairing) in "It's a Mad Mad Mad Rat Race" and later appears as an inmate at Santo Relaxo in "Jailcation". Originally from Space Ghost.
 Brak (voiced by Andy Merrill) - A cat-like alien who was seen on the movie poster for "Brakbud Peak" in "It's a Mad Mad Mad Rat Race" and later appears as an inmate at Santo Relaxo in "Jailcation". Originally from Space Ghost.
 Secret Squirrel - He was seen on a movie poster for "The Blow-ening!" in "It's a Mad Mad Mad Rat Race".
 Inch High (voiced by Fajer Al-Kaisi) - A miniature private investigator who was not pleased with Lippy and Hardy's debut comedy album and called it bad enough for them to lock him in a chest with it that they misplaced. In "The Box Thief", Inch High was in Jabberjaw and Huckleberry's unboxing video where the latter put him back in the box. Originally from Inch High, Private Eye.
 Dread Baron - An inmate at Santo Relaxo. Originally from Laff-A-Lympics.
 Hilarious P. Prankster - An inmate at Santo Relaxo. In "Heroes and Capes", Hilarious P. Prankster was shown to have been defeated by Yogi Bear in his Super Yogi alias only to slip away while Super Yogi was distracted. Originally from Yogi's Gang.
 Creeper - Top Cat posed as the prison guard Creeper when his gang were sent to Santo Paino until Top Cat secretly rerouted them to Santo Relaxo. Originally from Scooby-Doo, Where Are You!
 Scare Bear - He appears on the Lil' Professional badge.  Originally from Yogi's Space Race and Galaxy Goof-Ups.
 Sky Pirates - A group of sky pirates that operate over the skies of Jellystone.
 Captain Swashbuckle Swipe (voiced by Bernardo de Paula) - The captain of the sky pirates. In "Heroes and Capes", Captain Swipe was confronted by Boo Boo in his Simple Sailor alias at the jewelry store. Originally from Yogi's Gang.
 Lotta Litter (voiced by Georgie Kidder) - Member of the sky pirates who is the first lady of filth. She specializes in throwing garbage at anyone. Originally from Yogi's Gang.
 Mr. Smog (voiced by C.H. Greenblatt) - Member of the sky pirates. He specializes in smog attacks. In "Heroes and Capes", Mr. Smog was shown being chased by Wally Gator in his Pogo Prince alias. Originally from Yogi's Gang.
 Gossipy Witch of the West (voiced by Dana Snyder) - Member of the sky pirates who tells gossip. Originally from Yogi's Gang.
 Blue Falcon (voiced by Rob Riggle) - A falcon-themed superhero. Originally from Dynomutt, Dog Wonder.
 Dynomutt - Blue Falcon's robotic canine sidekick. Originally from Dynomutt, Dog Wonder.
 Mr. Hothead - He was seen running from Mayor Huckleberry Hound in his Armored Mayor alias. Originally from Yogi's Gang.
 Moltar - He was seen on the cover of the book "Moltar's Big Book of Fables and Slow Cooker Recipes" that Wally Gator wanted to take out of the library. Originally from Space Ghost.

References

External links
 

 List of characters
 List of characters
 Hanna-Barbera characters, List of
Hanna-Barbera